The population, population density, and land area for the cities of the European Union listed below are based on the entire city proper, the defined boundary or border of a city or the city limits of the city.

See also
List of cities by population density, worldwide

References

 https://ec.europa.eu/eurostat/statistics-explained/images/b/ba/Population_density_in_local_administrative_units_%28LAU2%29%2C_2015_%28inhabitants_km%C2%B2%29_Cities16.png

European Union-related lists
Population density
Europe
Europe